Norwegian Brazilians are Brazilian citizens who identify themselves as being of full or partial Norwegian ancestry or people who emigrated from Norway and reside in Brazil.

Norwegian immigration to Brazil started at the end of the 19th century, as well as several other waves of European immigration. The community of Norwegians and their descendants in Brazil is estimated to be the 3rd largest in the world, being surpassed only by the Norwegian communities in the United States and Canada.

In recent years, a few Norwegians and even Swedes have migrated to the littoral zone of the state of Rio Grande do Norte (mainly in Natal) and Ceará, attracted by the beaches and the tropical climate.

See also

 Scandinavian Brazilians

References

External links

 Official website of the Alfredo Andersen Museum

European Brazilian